Sylvia Eliina Ruuska (born July 4, 1942) is an American former competition swimmer, Olympic medalist, and former world record-holder in two events.

At the age of 14, Ruuska won two medals at the 1956 Summer Olympics in Melbourne, Australia.  She captured a silver medal by swimming for the second-place U.S. team in the women's 4×100-meter freestyle relay.  Individually, she also received a bronze medal for her third-place finish in the women's 400-meter freestyle.

On June 27, 1958, she became the first woman to set an official world record in the 400-meter individual medley, clocking 5:46.6.  Ruuska subsequently broke her own 400-meter record three times in 1958 and 1959, ultimately lowering the world mark to 5:40.2 on July 17, 1959.  She also set a new world record of 2:43.2 in the 200-meter individual medley on August 16, 1958, and breaking her own record with a time of 2:40.3 on January 14, 1959.  Both her 200-meter and 400-meter individual medley world records were later broken by Donna de Varona.  At the 1959 Pan American Games in Chicago, she won a silver medal for her second-place showing in the 400-meter freestyle (5:03.4), finishing behind fellow American Chris von Saltza (4:55.9).

At the 1960 Summer Olympics in Rome, Italy, Ruuska swam for the gold medal-winning U.S. team in the preliminary heats of the women's 4×100-meter freestyle relay.  Under the international swimming rules in effect in 1960, she did not receive a medal because she did not swim in the event final.

Ruuska was inducted into the International Swimming Hall of Fame in 1976.

See also

 List of Olympic medalists in swimming (women)
 List of Stanford University people
 World record progression 200 metres individual medley
 World record progression 400 metres individual medley

References

External links
 
  Sylvia Ruuska (USA) – Honor Swimmer profile at International Swimming Hall of Fame

1942 births
Living people
American female freestyle swimmers
American female medley swimmers
American people of Finnish descent
World record setters in swimming
Olympic bronze medalists for the United States in swimming
Olympic silver medalists for the United States in swimming
Swimmers from Berkeley, California
Stanford University alumni
Swimmers at the 1956 Summer Olympics
Swimmers at the 1959 Pan American Games
Swimmers at the 1960 Summer Olympics
Medalists at the 1956 Summer Olympics
Pan American Games silver medalists for the United States
Pan American Games medalists in swimming
Medalists at the 1959 Pan American Games
20th-century American women